Villa Jiménez is a town and the municipal seat of the municipality of Jiménez in the Mexican state of Michoacán.

History
In the mid-19th century, stagecoaches running between Zamora and Morelia forded the Ángulo River at what is now Villa de Jiménez. A man named Patrocinio Aguilar lived there and supplied travellers with provisions, so that the place became known as Vado de Aguilar ("Aguilar's Ford"). On May 30, 1910, the settlement was granted the status of a town (villa) and renamed after Mariano Jiménez, governor of Michoacán from 1885 to 1892.

Demographics
The population of Villa Jiménez has 3,974 inhabitants, which represents an average decrease of -0.68% per year in the period 2010-2020 based on the 4,249 inhabitants registered in the previous census. As of 2020, the density of the town was 1,626 inhabitants/km².

Economy
The main economic activity in Jiménez is agriculture. Corn is the main crop, followed by sorghum and forage oats. Chicken, cattle and pigs are also raised.

References

Populated places in Michoacán